General Ballard may refer to:

Colin Robert Ballard (1868–1941), British Army brigadier general
Joe N. Ballard (born 1942), U.S. Army lieutenant general
John Archibald Ballard (1829–1880), British Army lieutenant general